This Is the Noise That Keeps Me Awake is a 2017 autobiography by American alternative rock band Garbage with journalist and former Rolling Stone contributor Jason Cohen over a two-year period which coincided with the band's twentieth anniversary. The title comes from the lyric of their 1998 single "Push It".

The first edition, published by Akashic Books, is a large-format coffee table book is bound with an embossed cloth hardcover and finished with a dust jacket. The edges of the text pages, printed on matte art paper, are finished in pink. The book includes original pieces from all four members of Garbage: Shirley Manson, Butch Vig, Duke Erikson and Steve Marker, and incorporates previously unpublished photographs and personal snapshots.

"We were starting to forget what we wanted to remember," Manson said of the impetus to put the book together. "Twenty-two years is a long time to keep track of the magic and the madness." This Is the Noise That Keeps Me Awake is available to pre-order in several formats. The limited edition bundle includes a hardcover copy of the book, a custom collectable box and a 12-inch vinyl extended play featuring six previously unreleased live recordings - one each from the band's six albums. The first 1,000 units were signed by the band.

The release of This Is the Noise That Keeps Me Awake was augmented with a new single release, "No Horses", and the band co-headling a tour with Blondie.

Bonus 12" EP

Side A tracks were recorded live at the band's 20 Years Queer tour at Orpheum Theater in Madison, Wisconsin, on October 15, 2015 ("Milk"); and at two Not Your Kind of People World Tour concerts, at the House of Blues in Houston on October 9, 2012 ("You Look So Fine"), and at the Ancienne Belgique in Brussels ("Cup of Coffee") on November 25, 2012. The tracks on side B were all recorded at the band's show at Revention Music Center in Houston on September 6, 2016, as part of the Strange Little Birds tour.

Pat Pope controversy

In 2015, photographer Pat Pope posted an open letter to Garbage on his Facebook page, alleging that the band's management had approached him for permission to incorporate some of his images without fee, apart from appropriate credit. Pope felt that this was hypocritical on Garbage's part, and declined the use of the images. After the post went viral, and attracted media attention, Manson posted a response to Pope via the band's own Facebook page, stating that they had decided to ask photographers for the use of their images and respect any declined requests. Pope decided to draw a line under the debate that his open letter has started, and explain the reasons for his public refusal. Pope explained that he strongly felt that photography was being devalued by companies asking for work with recompense, or not even bothering gaining permission (Pope only discovered one of his images had been used in the booklet for the band's greatest hits album Absolute Garbage after purchasing a copy and opening the package).

References

External links
 This Is the Noise That Keeps Me Awake at Akashic Books

2017 non-fiction books
American memoirs
Books about rock musicians
English-language books
Garbage (band)
Music autobiographies
Akashic Books books